The 1976 All-East football team consists of American football players chosen by various selectors as the best players at each position among the Eastern colleges and universities during the 1976 NCAA Division I football season.

The undefeated 1976 Pittsburgh Panthers football team won the national championship and placed 10 players on the All-Eastern first-team selections of the AP and UPI. Pitt running back Tony Dorsett] also won the 1976 Heisman Trophy.

Offense

Quarterback
 Paul Micholko, Brown (AP-1)
 Leamon Hall, Army (UPI-1)

Running backs
 Tony Dorsett, Pitt (AP-1, UPI-1)
 John Pagliaro, Yale (AP-1, UPI-1)
 Glen Capriola, Boston College (UPI-1)
 Carson Long, Pitt (UPI-1)

Tight end
 Jim Corbett, Pitt (AP-1)
 Clennie Brundidge, Army (UPI-1)

Wide receivers
 Bob Farnham, Brown (AP-1, UPI-1)
 Steve Lewis, West Virginia (AP-1)

Tackles
 George Reihner, Penn State (AP-1, UPI-1)
 John Hanhauser, Pitt (AP-1)
 Brad Benson, Penn State (UPI-1)

Guards
 Tom Brzoza, Pitt (AP-1, UPI-1)
 Steve Schindler, Boston College (AP-1, UPI-1)

Center
 Chuck Lodge, Villanova (AP-1)
 John Pelusi, Pitt (UPI-1)

Defense

Ends
 Nate Toran, Rutgers (AP-1, UPI-1)
 Cecil Johnson, Pitt (AP-1)
 Byron Hemingway, Boston College (UPI-1)

Tackles
 John Alexander, Rutgers (AP-1, UPI-1)
 Randy Holloway, Pitt (AP-1, UPI-1)

Middle guard
 Al Romano, Pitt (AP-1, UPI-1)

Linebackers
 Kurt Allerman, Penn State (AP-1,  UPI-1)
 Bob Walls, Bostonn College (AP-1)
 Doug Curtis, Colgate (AP-1)
 Peter Cronan, Boston College (UPI-1)
 Ken Culbertson, West Virginia (UPI-1)

Defensive backs 
 Gary Petercuskie, Penn State (AP-1, UPI-1)
 Bob Jury, Pitt (AP-1, UPI-1)
 Tim Moresco, Syracuse (AP-1, UPI-1)

Key
 AP = Associated Press
 UPI = United Press International

See also
 1976 College Football All-America Team

References

All-Eastern
All-Eastern college football teams